The Chinese Basketball Association (CBA) Finals MVP is the annual award that is handed out at the end of each Chinese Basketball Association (CBA) playoff finals series to the most valuable player of that season's CBA Finals. The award was first distributed at the end of the 2003–04 season and Du Feng was the first winner. Before that, the award was named the Chinese Basketball Association (CBA) League MVP. From that year until the 2011–12 season, international players (non Chinese/Taiwanese) were not allowed to win the award. Starting with the 2012–13 season, international players became eligible to win the award.

CBA League MVP winners

CBA Finals MVP winners

See also
CBA Most Valuable Player
CBA Scoring Champion

References

External links
 CBA league official website 
 CBA federation official website 
 CBA at Asia-Basket.com 

Chinese Basketball Association awards